Forte de Santo António (Porto Judeu) is a fort in the Azores. It is located in Angra do Heroísmo, on the island of Terceira.
<

Fort Santo Antonio
Santo António